Hydrophilus ovatus is a species of water scavenger beetle in the family Hydrophilidae. It is found in the eastern United States from Maine south to Florida and west to Texas and Kansas, southern Ontario and Quebec, and south to southern Mexico.

References

Hydrophilinae
Articles created by Qbugbot
Beetles described in 1868